Grzelak is a Polish surname, it may refer to:
 Bartłomiej Grzelak, Polish footballer
 Bartosz Grzelak, Polish-Swedish football player and manager
 Klaudia Grzelak, Polish volleyball player
 Mikołaj Grzelak, Polish footballer 
 Rafał Grzelak, Polish footballer
 Rafał Grzelak (born 1988), Polish footballer
 Stanisław Grzelak, Polish cyclist 
 Tadeusz Grzelak, Polish boxer

Polish-language surnames